Sings Reign Rebuilder is the debut album of the Canadian band Set Fire to Flames. It was released by Alien8 Recordings, FatCat Records in 2001.

The album was recorded in a century old house (either named or later dubbed 15 Ontario) apparently bound for destruction. From the liner notes: "your bulldozers and wrecking ball can make match-sticks out of the rickety staircase and crookt/creaking floorboards---but they can't erase the recording that was made here." As such, several sounds usually edited out of the recording process, including creaking floors, paper shuffling and outside noises, were left intact on the final album. The most notable occurrence is that of a police car driving by with its siren blaring at the end of "Love Song for 15 Ontario"; the vehicle was later credited as a guest performer on the song.

An underlying concept in the work is the "Lying Dying Wonder Body", which consists of spoken word passages dealing with theoretical and political concepts that concern global climate and love.

Track listing

Personnel
 Aidan Girt: drums
 Beckie Foon: cello
 Bruce Cawdron: drums/percussion
 Christof Migone: reel to reel motors/banjo/contact mics
 David Bryant: guitar
 Genevieve Heistek: viola
 Gordon Krieger: bass clarinet
 Jean-Sébastien Truchy: bass
 Mike Moya: guitar
 Roger Tellier-Craig: guitar
 Sophie Trudeau: violin
 Speedy: guitar
 Thea Pratt: French horn

References

External links
 'Sings Reign Rebuilder' information page from set fire to flames website

2001 debut albums
Set Fire to Flames albums
Alien8 Recordings albums
FatCat Records albums